Edlund is a Swedish surname. Notable people with the surname include:

Ben Edlund (born 1968), American comic book artist and writer
Christoffer Edlund (born 1987), Swedish Bandy player
Erik Edlund (1819–1888), Swedish physicist
Helen Edlund (born 1968), Swedish curler
Hélène Edlund (1858–1941), Swedish photographer
Johan Edlund (born 1971), Swedish singer, guitarist and keyboardist
Lars Edlund (1922–2013), Swedish composer, organist and music teacher
Madelaine Edlund (born 1985), Swedish footballer
Pär Edlund (born 1967), Swedish ice hockey player
Richard Edlund (born 1940), American special effects cinematographer
Sylvia Edlund (1945–2014), Canadian botanist

Swedish-language surnames